Zasavci is a settlement in the Municipality of Ormož in northeastern Slovenia. It lies in the hills above Miklavž pri Ormožu. The area belongs to the traditional region of Styria. It is now included in the Drava Statistical Region.

References

External links
Zasavci on Geopedia

Populated places in the Municipality of Ormož